Oyebanjo is the name of several people:

D'banj (born 1980), Nigerian musician
Lanre Oyebanjo (born 1990), footballer